Kouspades is a village and a community in the southern part of the island of Corfu, Greece.  It is part of the municipal unit of Korissia.  In 2011 its population was 295 for the settlement, and 349 for the community, which includes the beach village Boukaris. Kouspades is located south of the city of Corfu. It is situated in low hills near the coast.

Population

See also
List of settlements in the Corfu regional unit

References

External links
 Kouspades at the GTP Travel Pages

Populated places in Corfu (regional unit)